Hamza Mathlouthi (born 25 July 1992) is a Tunisian professional footballer who plays as a right-back for Zamalek SC and the Tunisia national team.

Club career
Mathlouthi started his career playing for CA Bizertin, he later played for CS Sfaxien, before joining Egyptian club Zamalek SC in 2020.

International career
Mathlouthi was part of the Tunisian squad in the 2015, 2017 and 2021 Africa Cup of Nations tournaments.  He scored his first goal for his country in the 2021 tournament (played in January 2022) against Mauritania in Limbe.

Honours 
CA Bizertin
 Tunisian Ligue Professionnelle 1: runner-up 2011–12

Zamalek
Egyptian Premier League 2020–21, 2021-22

Egypt Cup: 2021

References

External links 
 

1992 births
Living people
People from Bizerte
Tunisian footballers
Association football defenders
Tunisia international footballers
2015 Africa Cup of Nations players
2017 Africa Cup of Nations players
2021 Africa Cup of Nations players
Egyptian Premier League players
CA Bizertin players
CS Sfaxien players
Zamalek SC players
Tunisian expatriate footballers
Tunisian expatriate sportspeople in Egypt
Expatriate footballers in Egypt
2016 African Nations Championship players
Tunisia A' international footballers